Ana Maria Brescia Cafferata (born ) is a Peruvian billionaire heiress. She owns 30% of Grupo Breca, a conglomerate founded by her Italian-born father. Her stakes in the group were previously managed by her brothers, Mario and Pedro, before dying in 2013 and 2014, respectively. She actually is one of Peru's richest people and the richest woman in that country (the only female billionaire there). She never married and never had any children.

References

Living people
1920s births
Peruvian people of Italian descent
People from Lima
Peruvian billionaires
Female billionaires
Brescia family